The Cape Romano Stilt Houses were a pair of wooden stilt houses located on Caxambas Island, south of Marco Island in Cape Romano in the Ten Thousand Islands of Collier County, Florida. It once neighbored the Cape Romano Pyramid House and Dome House.

History 
The stilt homes were constructed in the early 1980s, possibly by Bob Lee, the owner and builder of the Cape Romano Dome House. The houses were originally constructed on sand, but erosion which became rapid in 1986 eventually submerged the stilts, although the inhabitable rooms remained above water. It is unknown who inhabited the homes or when they left. The houses survived longer than the Pyramid House, and outlasted many hurricanes, despite their vulnerable wood construction. One of the homes was destroyed sometimes before 2004, but the other succumbed to the 2005 Hurricane Wilma.

References

Houses in Collier County, Florida